Van Honthorst is a Dutch surname. Notable people with this name include:-

Gerard van Honthorst (1592-1656), artist
Willem van Honthorst (1594-1666), artist

It was also the name of a Dutch steamship.
, in service 1943-46